Rules is the second and final album by indie pop band The Whitest Boy Alive. It was recorded in Punta Burros Nayarit, Mexico, where the band was staying to rest after a long tour. In early 2009, Australian radio station Triple J named Rules their feature album of the week. The track "1517" was featured in FIFA 10, the video game by EA Sports. This would be the last material the members of the band would record together until the 2020 release of the non-album single "Serious".

Track listing

CD sequencing

Vinyl sequencing
The vinyl release of Rules sports a different track order to the CD release:

Charts

References

2009 albums
The Whitest Boy Alive albums
Service (record label) albums